The Pennsylvania Conference for Women is a non-profit, non-partisan, one-day professional and personal development event for women that features speakers sharing inspirational stories and leading seminars on the issues such as health, personal finance, executive leadership, small business and entrepreneurship, work/life balance, branding and social media marketing. The Conference offers opportunities for business networking, professional development, and personal growth. It attracts about 7,000 attendees.

History 
The first annual Pennsylvania Conference for Women was held in 2004 in Pittsburgh. Former Governor Edward G. Rendell, in conjunction with the Pennsylvania Commission on Women, officially hosted the event. The conference has featured keynote speakers including Madeleine Albright, former U.S. Secretary of State; Sandra Day O’Connor, Justice of the U.S. Supreme Court; Indra Nooyi, Chairman and CEO of PepsiCo; and Doris Kearns Goodwin, presidential historian and best-selling author.

The Pennsylvania Conference for Women launched its Scholarship Program in 2005 in an effort to expand the Conference goal of fostering an educated workforce. More than 40 Pennsylvania colleges and universities commit to this program each year. Currently, four-year institutions dedicate $2,500 in scholarship funds for four years. For two-year colleges, $750 is awarded for two years. The statewide program has provided more than $2M in scholarships to Pennsylvania women of all ages.

Each partnering institution is responsible for identifying qualified candidates, overseeing the selection process and administering the awards at their respective campuses.

Past Conference Speakers 
The conference has hosted speakers including:
Robin Roberts; Diane Keaton; Jill Abramson; Candy Chang; Jane Pauley; Tory Johnson; Madeleine Albright; Ellen Alemany; Martha Beck; Bertice Berry; Indra Bnooyi; Nancy Brinker; Marcus Bukingham; Majora Carter; Jean Chatzky; Kelly Corrigan; Sandra Day O'Connor; Linda Ellerbee; Mia Farrow; Helene Gayle; Nancy Giles; Farkhonda Hassan; Glenda Hatchett; Teresa Heinz; Jessica Herrin; Diane Holder; Mae Jemison; Marion Jones; Sarah Jones; Doris Kearns Goodwin; Evelyn Lauder; Lisa Ling; Laura Liswood; Monica Malpass; Judith Martin; Tracey Matisak; Denise Morrison; Betsy Myers; Suze Orman; Julia Reed; Anne Richards; Judith Rodin; Gretchen Rubin; Zainab Salbi; Liz Smith; Gloria Steinem; Christy Turlington Burns; Naomi Tutu; Marian Wright Edelman; Sheryl WuDunn.

 Official website

Organizations based in Pennsylvania
Women's organizations based in the United States
History of women in Pennsylvania